Kelly Crowley (born 1976) is an American Paralympic swimmer and cyclist.

Competition
Crowley is 17-time Disability Swimming National Champion. She is a two-time Paralympic swimming Gold medalist which she earned for the participation in 2004 Summer Paralympics in Athens, Greece. Later on in 2006 she joined cycling and by 2007 won Bronze medal for Para Cycling. The same year she became a champion in Time Trial World Championship. Three years later she received another bronze medal this time for Individual Road Race in Quebec, Canada. In 2012 she was awarded bronze one more time for the same participation as previous years. The same year she got 2nd two times in UCI Para-cycling World Cup in Rome, Italy.

Personal life
Crowley was born with a right arm that had no elbow and only three fingers. She was raised up in Menlo Park, California. In 1999 she graduated from Santa Clara University.

Currently she is a coach for USA Swimming and is also a founder of Victory Sport Project. Her other jobs include Motivational speaker for such corporations as Levi Strauss and The Hartford on which she promotes disability-awareness and mental and physical health speeches.

In 2017 Kelly Crowley and Katie Holloway had launched a podcast called Inside Para Sport and had already had Muffy Davis as a guest speaker on one of the 5 episodes.

References

External links

Paralympic swimmers of the United States
Paralympic gold medalists for the United States
Paralympic bronze medalists for the United States
Living people
Schools of the Sacred Heart alumni
1976 births
Date of birth missing (living people)
Medalists at the 2004 Summer Paralympics
Medalists at the 2012 Summer Paralympics
Cyclists at the 2012 Summer Paralympics
Paralympic cyclists of the United States
Paralympic medalists in cycling
Paralympic medalists in swimming